The UBC's Okanagan Campus (commonly referred to as UBC Okanagan and UBCO) is one of the University of British Columbia's campus located in Kelowna, British Columbia, Canada.

The  campus is the research and innovation hub in the province's southern interior, in British Columbia's Okanagan Valley and home to over 11,562 undergraduate and graduate students. UBC Okanagan has 62 undergraduate programs and 19 graduate programs.

History

Okanagan University College 

The current site of UBC Okanagan was initially used by Okanagan University College (OUC), which was founded in 1989 (in principle) as a part of a plan by the government to improve access to post-secondary education in the Southern Interior British Columbia. Initially, degrees were awarded in partnership with other universities, but by 1995, the university college began granting degrees in its name. In the late 1990s, OUC started lobbying efforts to gain full university status.

University of British Columbia 
In December 2002, the British Columbia Progress Board submitted a report to the provincial government, recognizing the need to expand post-secondary education in the Okanagan. The board, chaired by the University of British Columbia president Martha Piper, recommended that the province extend "the mandate of an existing provincial University to Kelowna...."

In March 2004, BC Premier Gordon Campbell and UBC President Martha Piper held a press conference, announcing that OUC would be dissolved. OUC's university operations would be consolidated at its North Kelowna Campus and would come under the University of British Columbia. The other programs and campuses of OUC would form a new community college, which would later take on the name Okanagan College. The OUC Board was reportedly not invited to the press conference. It had not been told in advance of the imminent demise of the OUC Board and removal or the termination of the majority of the OUC board members.

According to the Ministry backgrounder released at the time, the affiliation between UBC Vancouver and UBC Okanagan would be "based on the highly successful University of California model" and that "UBC Okanagan and UBC Vancouver will each have an independent senate to set academic priorities for their respective institutions, based regional needs and priorities. At the same time, they will share a common board of governors, with strong representation from each region."

As of December 2019, UBC's Okanagan campus is represented on the UBC Board of Governors by John Klironomos and Nicole Udzenija.

Academics 
UBC's Okanagan campus offers a wide range of undergraduate and graduate (Ph.D. & Masters) programs. There are more than 50 undergraduate programs in Arts, Education, Engineering, Fine Arts, Human Kinetics, Management, Media, Medicine, Nursing, and Sciences. The university also offers graduate programs in the following areas: Biology, Biochemistry, and Molecular Biology, Chemistry, Computer Sciences, Education, Engineering, English, Earth, and Environmental Sciences, Fine Arts, Interdisciplinary Graduate Studies, Management, Mathematics, Medical Physics, Nursing, Psychology, and Social Work.

Research 
Since established in 2005, the research capability and researcher profiles have increased rapidly. Annual tri-council funding increased from $1.1M to $5.9M between 2005 and 2015. The total research funding reached $14.7M/year, with 714 projects in 2015. Research at UBC Okanagan is highly collaborative, emphasizing direct student involvement to advance discoveries in fields of importance globally and locally. The Survive and Thrive Applied Research (STAR) initiative exemplifies this spirit of innovation with cutting-edge projects, including control software for unmanned aerial vehicles. STAR creates a bridge between UBC Okanagan and industry, specializing in technologies for human protection and performance in extreme, remote, or rural conditions. There are currently 15 research centers and 505 faculty members on the Okanagan campus.

Campus 

The UBC's Okanagan Campus is situated on a hill between Glenmore and Ellison in Kelowna and resides on traditional Syilx territory. Street names are signed in English and Nsyilxcən language. The campus consists of Upper Campus, Lower Campus, Innovation Precinct, and Endowment Lands.

Lower and Upper Campuses situated around the Courtyard and University Walk host the Okanagan campus's core academic and administrative functions. Most institutional and administrative buildings are located on the Lower Campus, including the UBC Okanagan Library, Learning Commons and the Transit Exchange. The adjacent Upper Campus contains most on-campus student housing and some institutional, childcare, and recreational buildings.

The Charles E. Fipke Centre for Innovative Research (FIP) is a multi-purpose academic and research facility, including research labs, classrooms and teaching labs, offices, student commons, lecture theatre, and an animal care facility. The Arts and Sciences Centre (ASC), and Engineering, Management and Education Building (EME) were completed in 2011. The Arts and Science Centre include a live animal testing facility.

The expansion of UBC Faculty of Medicine created a new distributed medical site, the Southern Medical Program at UBC Okanagan. The Reichwald Health Sciences Centre, a medical school building, was completed by the end of 2011 and named for benefactors Klaus and Lydia Reichwald. Part of the program is also located in the Clinical Academic Campus building adjacent to the Kelowna General Hospital.

Learning Commons Building, referred to simply as The Commons, opened in late 2018 as part of the UBC Okanagan Library expansion and contains study spaces, media labs, special collections and archives.

The Innovation Precinct is  land located at the bottom of the hill along Innovation Drive. Most of the land is currently used as a parking lot, and two industrial buildings at the north end are used for collaborative researches between the university and external organizations. A future expansion will convert the land to the regional hub for research and innovations.

UBC Endowment Lands (West Campus Lands) is  agricultural land, which occupies the western half of the Okanagan campus along John Hindle Drive and contains UBC Plant Growth Facility. UBC Endowment Lands are part of ALR and are reserved for future research and recreational uses. It is not to be confused with University Endowment Lands, an unincorporated area adjacent to Vancouver where the UBC's Point Grey campus is located.

Transportation 
Although the campus itself is located in a semi-rural area, it has a direct interchange with Highway 97 and Downtown Kelowna can be reached with 15 minutes of driving. It is also close to Kelowna International Airport.

UBC Okanagan Exchange is the northern terminus of express bus route 97X Kelowna RapidBus, which provides Downtown Kelowna access in approximately 20 minutes. The exchange is a major transfer point for bus services to the Airport and beyond north to Lake Country and Vernon. The campus is also connected to the regional bikeway, Okanagan Rail Trail and John Hindle Drive Multi-use Pathway.

Downtown Kelowna Campus 
UBC's Okanagan Campus also has a presence in Downtown Kelowna with UBC Innovation Library and Innovation UBC Hub locations. UBC announced in June 2020 that it's planning to expand its presence in Downtown Kelowna by constructing a new  mixed-use office tower on Doyle Ave.

There is also a Southern Medical Clinical Academic Campus located at Kelowna General Hospital.

The university has been approved to build a 46 storey tower that will serve as a downtown campus and student residences.

Expansion 
According to the UBC Okanagan Campus Plan from September 2015, the next 20 years will see drastic expansion in research, teaching, student residence, and commercial spaces. A proposed  increase in academic space would more than double the current capacity. The student residence is proposed to increase by approximately 2,200 beds to a total of approximately 3,900 beds. The additional space will remain within the main Okanagan campus, rather than expanding into the West Endowment Lands. Sustainability upgrades to 11 of the existing buildings are also underway.

Future projects include the newly constructed Nechako Commons Block building adjacent to the UNC (University Centre), additional residences, an engineering design building, a retrofit of a nearby industrial building billed as Innovation Precinct, and various other, more minor projects.

Student life

The University Centre (UNC) contains many student services, including the Students' Union Okanagan of UBC office, meeting rooms, student club space, cafeteria and pub, cinema, multi-faith space, UBC Health & Wellness Clinic, learning centers, the Collegia as well as Picnic, which is a new centre where students can seek mental and sexual health support. The university also maintains a Student Experience Office that organizes orientation programs, commuter Collegia spaces, volunteer opportunities, and mentorship options.

Food establishments on campus are exclusively operated by UBC Food Services or the students' union. By September 2021, Nechako Commons Block (NCH) adjacent to UNC will house a 500-seat Pritchard Dining Hall, providing unlimited food access for students on a meal plan. A campus convenience store, student housing and business operations offices will also be relocated to Nechako Commons Block.

Valhalla Residence
The residence has the ability to accommodate more than 1000 students in a single-connected room. Valhalla Vikings is a common term used for those all that have been staying in the Valhalla residence. Single-connected rooms are layouts of rooms in which 2 private rooms share a single bathroom and thus, they are named single-connected rooms. Valhalla has 4 residence floors and a single basement. Each floor has unique features which other floors aren't equipped with. For example, the first floor of Valhalla comes with a vending machine which no other floor has. The second floor has a water filter that goes through an 8 step filtration process and no other floor has this. The third floor has the largest floor lounge in all of Valhalla floors and lastly, the fourth floor is the floor with greatest number of washing machines. Another advantage of staying in a residence on-campus is that you get subscribed to an all-you-care-to-eat meal plan.

Collegia
Common rooms known as Collegia were created for commuter students, containing kitchen facilities, study space, lounges and social areas. Each Collegium has theme and targeted for a particular student population, however, they are open to all students. The campus' Collegia program has gained national attention as a home-away-from-home for its large commuter population.

Greek life
The Okanagan campus currently has two sororities and two fraternities. The sororities are Kappa Beta Gamma and Alpha Omega Epsilon. The fraternities are Sigma Phi Delta and Phi Delta Theta. Alpha Omega Epsilon and Sigma Phi Delta are both International Organizations and have membership restrictions based upon faculty (Engineering students for Sigma Phi Delta, Engineering and Technical Science students for Alpha Omega Epsilon). Theta Phi is a local sorority open to all faculties. Phi Delta Theta is an international fraternity open to students in all faculties. The Okanagan campus does not allow Greek housing, so none of these organizations have an official house or room on campus.

Campus media

The Phoenix 
The Phoenix is the bi-weekly student newspaper at the University of British Columbia's Okanagan campus. It was established in 1989 at former Okanagan College.

UBCO.TV 
UBCO.TV was a web-based TV station that existed until 2016 and created videos about research, teaching, current events and campus life at the Okanagan campus. UBCO.TV was also streamed on TVs across the campus in common areas.

UBC Studios Okanagan and UBC Communications Services took over the UBCO.TV functions and co-manages a YouTube channel.

Faculties and Schools 

The Okanagan campus has the following faculties and schools:
College of Graduate Studies
Faculty of Creative and Critical Studies
Faculty of Applied Sciences
School of Engineering
Faculty of Health and Social Development
School of Nursing
School of Health and Exercise Sciences
School of Social Work
Faculty of Medicine Southern Medical Program
Faculty of Management
Okanagan School of Education
Irving K. Barber Faculty of Arts and Social Sciences
Irving K. Barber Faculty of Science

References

Further reading
 Freake, R. (2005). OUC Memoirs. Okanagan University College, Kelowna.

External links 

 
 UBC Food Services Okanagan
 Students' Union Okanagan of UBC

Okanagan
Education in Kelowna
Universities and colleges in the Okanagan